is Yuki Uchida's fourth album (including one EP), released in Japan on 23 March 1996 by King Records (reference: KICS-540). It reached number 20 on the Oricon charts.

Track listing
  
  
 Baby's Universe 
  
  
  
  
  
  
 

1996 albums
Yuki Uchida albums